Air Martinique  was an airline based in the island of Martinique in the Lesser Antilles in the Caribbean. Its head office was on the grounds of Fort-de-France Airport, now Martinique Aimé Césaire International Airport, in Le Lamentin.

History
Air Martinique was founded in 1974 as Compagnie Antillaise d'Affretments Aériens-CAAA.  The official operating name from the early 1980s was Societé Nouvelle Air Martinique (S.N.A.M.).

In 1982, Air Martinique was operating regional service in the Caribbean with small Britten-Norman BN-2 Islander and de Havilland Canada DHC-6 Twin Otter aircraft with scheduled passenger service from Barbados, Dominica, Fort-de-France, Mustique, Saint Lucia, Saint Vincent (Antilles) and Union Island.  The airline had previously operated Sud Aviation Caravelle jet service in the Caribbean region in 1980.

In 1993, Air Martinique was operating wide body McDonnell Douglas DC-10-30 transatlantic service between Fort-de-France and Pointe-a-Pitre in the French Caribbean and Paris Orly Airport.  By 1995, the air carrier was continuing to operate regional services in the Caribbean (using the two letter "PN" IATA airline code at this time which had replaced the two letter "NN" airline code formerly used by Air Martinique) with flights to its headquarters base at the Fort-de-France airport on Martinique from Pointe-a-Pitre, Saint Lucia, Saint Maarten, Saint Vincent and Union Island operated with ATR 42 and Dornier 228 turboprop aircraft.  In 1999, Air Martinique was operating Boeing 737-200 jet service to Miami.

In July 2000, Air Martinique was merged with Air Guadeloupe, Air St Barthélémy and Air St Martin to form Air Caraïbes.

Destinations served in 1997

FDF - Fort-de-France, Martinique - now Martinique Aime Cesaire International Airport (headquarters and main base for the airline)
DCF - Dominica, Dominica - Canefield Airport
CIW - Canouan Island, St. Vincent and the Grenadines - Canouan Airport
PAP - Port-au-Prince, Haiti - Toussaint Louverture International Airport
PTP - Pointe A Pitre, Guadeloupe -Pointe-à-Pitre International Airport
SFG - Grand Case, Saint Martin - L'Espérance Airport
SLU - Castries, Saint Lucia - George F. L. Charles Airport
SVD - St Vincent, St. Vincent and The Grenadines - E.T. Joshua Airport
SXM - Saint Maarten, Netherlands Antilles - Princess Juliana International Airport
UNI - Union Island, St. Vincent and the Grenadines - Union Island Airport

Fleet
Air Martinique operated the following aircraft types at various times during its existence:

5 - ATR 42-300
1 - ATR 42-500
1 - McDonnell Douglas DC-10-30
? - Boeing 737-200
2 - SE 210 Caravelle VI-R
? - de Havilland Canada DHC-6 Twin Otter series 300 
3 - Dornier 228-202K
1 - Fokker F27-100 Friendship
1 - Fairchild Hiller FH-227B
2 - Britten-Norman BN-2 Islander

References

External links

Fleet and Code Data
Accident/Incident report
Photos at AirlinersNet
TimetableImages
AirTimes timetables

Air Caraïbes
Airlines of Martinique
Defunct airlines of France
Airlines established in 1974
Airlines disestablished in 2000
French companies established in 1974
French companies disestablished in 2000